Equitable Holdings, Inc. (formerly The Equitable Life Assurance Society of the United States and AXA Equitable Life Insurance Company, and also known as The Equitable) is an American financial services and insurance company that was founded in 1859 by Henry Baldwin Hyde. In 1991, French insurance firm AXA acquired majority control of The Equitable.

In 2004, the company officially changed its name to AXA Equitable Life Insurance Company. By 2018, the company had over 15,800 agents licensed by the State of California. In January 2020, it changed its name to Equitable Holdings, Inc. following its spinoff from AXA and the related public offerings beginning in May 2018.

History

Equitable opened its headquarters at the Equitable Life Building in 1870 in the Financial District of Manhattan, with entrances facing Broadway, Pine Street, and Cedar Street. Aside from Hyde, who was president of Equitable, the firm's officers included James Waddell Alexander (Vice President), George W. Phillips (Actuary) who was Vice President of the Actuarial Society of America, and Samuel Borrowe (Secretary). Borrowe's family was a prominent New York family connected to the Hallett and Alsop families.

Between 1889 and 1891, the Equitable Life Assurance Society of the United States built in the Innere Stadt of Vienna, Austria, the sumptuous Palais Equitable, a mansion at Stock-im-Eisen-Platz in the city center next to the Stephansplatz.

James Waddell Alexander, the son of James Waddel Alexander, was the company president at the time of the Hyde costume ball scandal in 1905, in which James Hazen Hyde, the son of the founder and a vice president of the company, was falsely accused through a media smear campaign initiated by Alexander and board directors E. H. Harriman, Henry Clay Frick and J.P. Morgan of charging a fabulous $200,000 costume ball to the company.  The repercussions rocked Wall Street and resulted in an investigation of the entire insurance industry by the State of New York.

After the company's headquarters building burned down in 1912, Equitable erected the Equitable Building on the same site in Manhattan.

In 1943, during World War II, Equitable began underwriting policies for the War Agencies Employees Protective Association to provide group life insurance to U.S. Government employees working in or around war zones. Through WAEPA, Equitable sold policies to employees of some 40 U.S. agencies, including individuals from the Offices of Strategic Services and War Information, which often sent their men behind enemy lines, and air-traveling statesmen and Congressmen. By May 1945, only 24 death claims had been filed (about half the normal peacetime rate for a group plan covering 7,000 workers), allowing the insurer to return roughly 30% of the premiums to WAEPA.

In 1985, the Equitable Life Assurance Society of the United States, then the third largest life insurance company in the country, formed Equitable Real Estate Investment Management, a subsidiary used by Equitable Life to develop and finance new real estate projects and manage the US$20 billion worth of real estate under Equitable's control.

In December 1990, Equitable announced its decision to demutualize under New York's liberalizing laws. This was intended to enable the Equitable to increase and diversify its asset base.

AXA acquisition
On July 18, 1991, AXA Group of France bought a $1 billion stake in Equitable Life Assurance Society, for a 49% stake in the business. This enabled Equitable to set aside $500 million for losses in its real estate and junk bond portfolios. There had been rumors that Equitable was nearing a bankruptcy filing prior to the AXA Group infusion of capital.

The investment by AXA Group significantly altered the trajectory of both companies. By 1997, the assets of the U.S. operation, the Equitable Insurance Group, had reached nearly a quarter of a billion (typo for trillion?) dollars, and by 2003, AXA Equitable Insurance Company was the leading carrier in the world with more than 50 million clients, in more than 50 countries, and with nearly a trillion dollars in client assets.

By 2018, AXA, facing tougher European solvency laws, decided to re-balance its operations from life and annuities and towards property and casualty – from financial risks to insurance risks. As a result, the company decided to begin the process to spin-off the U.S. operations, the old Equitable Life Assurance company. In its filing, AXA noted that once the IPO took place, there would be four separate companies created: AXA Equitable Life Insurance Company, AXA Distribution Holding Corp., EQ AZ Life Re Company, and MONY Life Insurance Company of America.

Equitable Holdings
In May 2018, AXA announced the successful completion of the IPO of AXA Equitable Holdings, raising $2.75 billion on the sale of 24.5% of the outstanding shares. Additionally, the company announced an issuance of $750 million of bonds mandatorily exchangeable into shares of AXA Equitable Holdings stock. And finally, $502 million of options were exercised, bringing the total to $4.02 billion in proceeds to AXA.

On March 25, 2019, AXA announced the successful completion of a secondary common stock offering of 40 million shares of AXA Equitable Holdings, Inc. (ticker EQH), bringing down their ownership stake from approximately 60% to 48.3% and raising net proceeds of $1.5 billion.

On November 7, 2019, AXA announced the sale of its remaining stake in AXA Equitable Holdings (EQH), selling 144 million shares of common stock to Goldman Sachs, which was the sole underwriter for the public offering of the shares. The expected close date was stated by the company at the time as November 13, 2019. This brought to a close a long and largely successful chapter in the Equitable's history – the end of the AXA Group ownership of the company.

On January 14, 2020, Equitable unveiled its new branding. In addition to an operating name change, the refreshed brand included a new logo, representative of the Greek goddess Athena, which has been a consistent element of the company’s 160-year-old visual identity.

References

External links

 

 Equitable Life Assurance Society of the United States Records at Baker Library Historical Collections, Harvard Business School

1859 establishments in New York (state)
2018 initial public offerings
American companies established in 1859
Axa
Broadway (Manhattan)
Companies based in New York (state)
Companies listed on the New York Stock Exchange
Financial services companies established in 1859
Financial services companies of the United States
Insurance companies of the United States